710 Naval Air Squadron (710 NAS) was a Naval Air Squadron of the Royal Navy's Fleet Air Arm. 710 NAS was a seaplane squadron that was stood up at RNAS Lee on Solent on 23 August 1939. They were equipped with the Supermarine Walrus flying boat and did multiple deployments onboard HMAS Albatross (1928), a seaplane tender. They performed convoy escort, anti submarine patrols, and air sea rescue services in the Atlantic off the west coast of Africa and in the Indian Ocean, in addition to support roles like pulling target drogues for gunnery practice and aerial photography. The squadron supported Allied landings during Battle of Madagascar in April and remained in the area through November. The squadron did some further work in the Indian Ocean but was eventually sent back to England where it was disbanded on 14 October 1943. The squadron was reformed on 7 October 1944 on the Isle of Man as a torpedo training squadron equipped with Fairey Barracuda and Fairey Swordfish torpedo bombers. The squadron was finally disbanded at HMS Urley [RNAS Ronaldsway] on 20 December 1945.

Notes

References 

http://www.wings-aviation.ch/32-FAA/4-Sqn/710-NAS.htm

700 series Fleet Air Arm squadrons
Military units and formations established in 1939
Air squadrons of the Royal Navy in World War II